Sarswati Chaudhary (born 12 February 1997) is a Nepalese female track and field athlete who competes in the 100 metres. She was her nation's sole representative at the 2019 World Athletics Championships, where she competed in the heats of the women's 100 m and set a Nepalese record of 12.72 seconds for the event, ranking 46th overall. She did not qualify to compete in the semi-finals.

International competitions

References

External links
 

1997 births
Living people
Nepalese female sprinters
World Athletics Championships athletes for Nepal
Olympic athletes of Nepal
Athletes (track and field) at the 2020 Summer Olympics
Olympic female sprinters
21st-century Nepalese women